The Third Cape Cod Canal road bridge is a proposed bridge that would cross the Cape Cod Canal in Bourne, Massachusetts. Due to gridlock during peak summer months, and growing traffic issues even off-season, the need for a third canal crossing has been a topic of discussion for many years. The concept of a third crossing has gained steam in recent years, culminating in a proposal for a toll bridge that would either sit directly between the existing bridges or adjacent to one of them.

Background
A third bridge over the Cape Cod Canal was first proposed during the 1950s to connect the proposed Route 25 to U.S. Route 6 north of the canal. The Commonwealth of Massachusetts determined that due to overcapacity on the Sagamore Bridge, a third vehicular crossing would be necessary sometime after 1975. Another proposal, for the Southside Connector expressway, suggested twinning the Bourne Bridge as part of capacity improvements for the roadway.  A local farmer fought the state's effort to cross her land with Route 25 for 25 years, eventually winning that fight in 1982.

The proposal for a third crossing was revived under the administration of Massachusetts Governor Deval Patrick. Identifying itself as Project SPAN, the effort floated plans: one would place a new bridge alongside the existing Sagamore Bridge and the other would entail building a bridge between the two current structures. 

The proposal for the bridge next to the Sagamore would involve a three-lane, southbound-only bridge to the west of the current structure. These additional lanes would allow the Sagamore Bridge's four narrow lanes (two each way) to be reduced to three wider northbound lanes. This proposal also calls for open-road tolling, meaning that drivers would not have to slow down. It would also involve an access road between Route 25 and Route 3, again proposed to cross the same farmland, which former Massachusetts Highway Administrator Frank DePaola admitted presents environmental challenges. The proposal for putting the bridge between the two bridges would involve a four-lane span, similar to the existing bridges.

Both bridges are currently being proposed to exist as part of a public-private partnership (P3), which current Governor Charlie Baker and his predecessor supported. State Senator Dan Wolf recommended the state first consider allowing a public agency to do the job to keep costs lower overall.

In October 2014, an event was set up for people interested in financing a separate high-speed toll lane along Route 3 and a new bridge. Over one hundred participants attended, which suggested a strong amount of interest in the idea. 

However, as of September 2016, the enthusiasm for a third road bridge had cooled and the state reported that it is considering two new bridges that would eventually replace the existing bridges.

References

See also 
 List of crossings of the Cape Cod Canal

Transportation in Barnstable County, Massachusetts
Proposed bridges in the United States
Bourne, Massachusetts